Tamás Grossmann (former Tamás Gecső) (born 16 March 1997) is a German sprint canoeist.

He participated at the 2018 ICF Canoe Sprint World Championships.

References

External links

1997 births
German male canoeists
Living people
ICF Canoe Sprint World Championships medalists in kayak
Sportspeople from Budapest